Santiago Dellapè (born 9 May 1978) is an Italian Argentine rugby union footballer. His usual position is at lock. He plays for Italy, and was included their 2003 Rugby World Cup squad to Australia. He has played for the French Top 14 side Racing Métro since the 2009–10 season, having moved to the Parisian club from fellow Top 14 side Toulon.

Born in La Plata, Argentina, Dellapè played rugby there until he joined L'Aquila in Italy in 2001. He soon moved to Benetton Treviso, and was a part of the team that won the 2003–04 Super 10 title. Dellapè made his debut for Italy during the 2002 Six Nations Championship match against France, and since the 2002 series, has become a regular in the Italian side.

External links
RBS 6 Nations profile
 Santiago Dellapè on rwc2003.irb.com

References

1978 births
Living people
Sportspeople from La Plata
Italian rugby union players
Rugby union locks
Barbarian F.C. players
Biarritz Olympique players
Benetton Rugby players
RC Toulonnais players
Racing 92 players
Italy international rugby union players